The 2018 World Junior Wrestling Championships were the 42nd edition of the World Junior Wrestling Championships and were held in Trnava, Slovakia between 17 and 23 September 2018.

Medal table

Team ranking

Medal summary

Men's freestyle

Men's Greco-Roman

Women's freestyle

References 

World Wrestling Junior Championships
World Junior Wrestling Championships